Harby & Stathern railway station is a former station on the Great Northern and London and North Western Joint Railway that served the villages of Harby and Stathern, in Leicestershire, England.

Overview
It was the locomotive exchange station for goods traffic, with GNR engines working to the north and LNWR engines working to the south. Harby & Stathern was chosen due to local opposition in Melton Mowbray.

It was difficult to manage and run. The sidings were insufficient at peak times and the turntable could not be accessed directly so engines had to shunt to gain access through the sidings. The station was not very convenient for local passengers as the approach road was about five hundred yards long. The goods yard was very large and the original warehouse still stands.

Services
The principal services were GNR services from Leicester Belgrave Road to Grantham and LNWR services from Northampton to Nottingham London Road Low Level. Initially the LNWR also ran trains from Northampton to Newark, but in 1882 these were replaced by trains running between Harby & Stathern and Newark which connected with the Nottingham trains. The connecting trains were down to one in 1910 and were withdrawn altogether by 1922. In addition there were many summer excursion trains.

Station masters

S.C. Drury
S.C. Gregory 1915 - ???? (formerly station master at Shirebrook)
Arthur William Pedley 1925 - 1935
F.H. Stables ca. 1939 - 1945 (afterwards station master at Bulwell Common)
G. Watson 1945 - ????

Closure
The station closed to regular traffic in 1953, but summer specials lasted until 1962.

References

Disused railway stations in Leicestershire
Railway stations in Great Britain opened in 1879
Railway stations in Great Britain closed in 1953
Former Great Northern Railway stations
Former London and North Western Railway stations